Harpalus mairei is a species of ground beetle in the subfamily Harpalinae. It was described by Paul de Peyerimhoff in 1928.

References

mairei
Beetles described in 1928